Flavia Cacace-Mistry born 1980 is an Italian British professional dancer. Her professional dance partner is Vincent Simone (they are branded when performing together as 'Vincent and Flavia'), and for ten years both partners appeared on the BBC's Strictly Come Dancing.

Early life
Cacace was born in Naples, the youngest of six children, and came to the United Kingdom with her family at the age of four when her father (a "chef") moved to another job. She attended St Peter's Catholic School in Guildford, and left in 1995.

Career

Dancing career
Cacace's mother insisted that each of the children have an activity, so she and her eldest sister joined the local ballroom dancing class – when Cacace was 6. After partnerships with two dance partners, Cacace and Simone (who had the same dance teacher in London) were both looking for partners. They decided to try out together in 1994, and they have been dancing together ever since.

Strictly Come Dancing
Highest and lowest scoring performances per dance

In 2005, Cacace appeared as a guest choreographer with Simone to choreograph an unscored group Argentine Tango to introduce the dance style to audiences. The dance was then introduced into the competitive roster so therefore a scored individual dance a year later.

In 2006, Cacace appeared in the fourth series of the BBC's Strictly Come Dancing. Her celebrity dancing partner  was comedian Jimmy Tarbuck. However, the couple withdrew after only one show, due to medical reasons.

Cacace was back dancing in the fifth series of the show, partnered with EastEnders star Matt Di Angelo. They got the only perfect score of the main series for their waltz in the final. They reached the final of the show, but were beaten by Alesha Dixon and her professional partner Matthew Cutler. She also took part in the 2007 Christmas special dancing the rumba with partner Matt, and achieved a score of 39. Cacace and Di Angelo also competed together in the live tour of Strictly Come Dancing in January and February 2008. They won more shows than any other couple, coming first overall sixteen times and second a further ten times (out of a total of forty shows).

Cacace took part in the sixth series of Strictly Come Dancing, partnered by actor Phil Daniels who was eliminated in the first week after a dance-off against Don Warrington despite Gary Rhodes being bottom after the judge's scores.

In late 2008, she took part in a Strictly Come Dancing special for Children in Need 2008 where she partnered presenter Terry Wogan against Tess Daly, partnered by Anton du Beke, who ended up as the winners.

Cacace also took part in the 2009 SCD Live tour partnering former Strictly Come Dancing semi-finalist Gethin Jones. They went on to win 6 shows out of 45 in total, coming second to her professional partner Vincent Simone and Rachel Stevens.

Cacace returned to Strictly Come Dancing for the seventh series in 2009, partnering Coronation Street and Queer as Folk actor Craig Kelly. The couple were in the bottom two in the second week against Lilia Kopylova and Richard Dunwoody, and were forced to perform their tango again. They won votes from three of the four judges and consequently made it through to the third week of the competition. They were also in the bottom two in week 4, against Darren Bennett and Lynda Bellingham. They went through to the next week on the casting vote of head judge Len Goodman. In week 5, the couple received their lowest score of the competition so far and were second from the bottom on the leaderboard. However, they were saved from the dance-off by the public. The  couple were eliminated in Week 8 of the competition, when the show went to Blackpool, after performing a cha-cha-cha.

Cacace then went on to dance once more with her tour partner of the previous year Gethin Jones in the 2009 Christmas special. They danced an American smooth to "Baby It's Cold Outside" and achieved a score of 38. Cacace then created choreography for Gethin's Cinderella panto which ran at the Yvonne Arnaud Theatre in her home town of Guildford and had a small guest appearance in the final show.

Cacace featured in the eighth series of the show, where her celebrity partner was actor Jimi Mistry. In the first week, their dance was given a score of 26 and they went on to make it to week 6 when they were eliminated despite finishing fourth on the leaderboard, a result that was widely seen as surprising.

In the ninth series, Cacace's partner was astrologer Russell Grant and they were the seventh couple to be eliminated.

Gymnast Louis Smith was Cacace's partner in the tenth season of the programme. They won the series on 22 December 2012.

On 1 June 2013, Cacace announced that she and Simone would not be competing in Strictly Come Dancing 2013 so they could work on other shows.

Other appearances
In January 2012, Cacace appeared on the BBC TV series The Magicians.

Cacace and Simone also have an App called 'Dance with Vincent and Flavia'. Dance with Vincent and Flavia is a free dance tutorial App from which the user can learn the fundamental dance steps and advance into a competent dancer with Vincent and Flavia's help. The App is published by International Celebrity Networks.

Titles
Career titles Cacace has earned from competitions, with her professional partner Simone:

UK Professional Ten Dance Champions 2002–2006
UK Professional Showdance Champions 2003–2006
UK Argentine Tango Champions, 2006
UK Ballroom Champions
World and European Ten Dance and Showdance finalists 2002–2006

Personal life
Cacace currently resides in Devon, with her former Strictly Come Dancing partner, Jimi Mistry.  She announced on Twitter on 5 January 2013 that they were engaged, and their marriage took place in London on 28 December 2013.

References

External links
Official website

Interview with Flavia Cacace
Interview on Aliveradio 107.30 16th Dec 2010
Interview in Guildford Magazine Dec 2010
Flavia talks about her diet on Celebrity Diet Doctor sept 22 2010
Surrey Life Magazine Flavia's perfect weekend April 2010

1980 births
Living people
Dancers from Naples
People from Surrey
Strictly Come Dancing winners
Italian expatriates in the United Kingdom
Italian female dancers
People educated at St Peter's Catholic School, Guildford